Behind The Player: Mike Inez is an Interactive Music Video featuring Alice in Chains bassist Mike Inez
. Released on November 1, 2008 by IMV, the DVD features Mike giving in-depth bass lessons for how to play "Again" and "A Little Bitter" by Alice in Chains and an intimate behind-the scenes look at his life as a professional musician, including rare photos and video.  The DVD also includes Mike jamming the two tracks with The Cult's drummer John Tempesta, VideoTab that shows exactly how Mike plays his parts in the two songs, as well as other bonus material.

IMV donates $.25 from the sale of each Behind the Player DVD to Little Kids Rock, an organization that gets instruments in the hands of underprivileged kids.

Contents
Behind The Player
Mike talks about his background, influences and gear, including rare photos and video

"Again" by Alice in Chains
Lesson: Mike gives an in-depth bass lesson for how to play the song
Jam: Mike jams the track with The Cult's drummer John Tempesta
VideoTab: Animated tablature shows exactly how Mike plays the track

"A Little Bitter" by Alice in Chains
Lesson: Mike gives an in-depth bass lesson for how to play the song
Jam: Mike jams the track with The Cult's drummer John Tempesta
VideoTab: Animated tablature shows exactly how Mike plays the track

Special features
Bonus Live Clip
Little Kids Rock promotional video

Personnel

Produced By: Ken Mayer & Sean E Demott
Directed By: Leon Melas
Executive Producer: Rick Donaleshen
Associate Producer: John 5
Director Of Photography: Ken Barrows
Sound Engineer: Matt Chidgey
Edited By: Jeff Morose
Mixed By: Matt Chidgey & Cedrick Courtois
Graphics By: Thayer Demay
Transcription By: Thayer Demay
Camera Operators: Brian Silva, Mike Chateneuf, Doug Cragoe
Technical Directors: Tyler Bourns & Chris Golde
Gaffer: John Parker

Assistant Director: Matt Pick
Lighting And Grip: Mcnulty Nielson
Key Grip: Jaletta Kalman
Artist Hospitality: Sasha Mayer
Shot At: Third Encore
Special Guest: John Tempesta
Cover Photo By: Stephanie Pick
Video Courtesy Of: Todd Shuss, Carol Peters Management, Peter “Videopete” Sicard
Photos Courtesy Of: Marty Temme, Mike Brown, Tracy Ketcher, Stephanie Pick
Photo Library Complements Of: Ultimaterockpix.Com

References

External links
Official website

Behind the Player